Bulbophyllum fascinator is a species of flowering plant in the orchid family Orchidaceae, native to northeastern India, Southeast Asia, and northern Malesia. Apseudobulbous epiphyte found in lowlands, it can be confused with Bulbophyllum putidum.

References

fascinator
Flora of India (region)
Flora of East Himalaya
Flora of Indo-China
Flora of Malaya
Flora of Sumatra
Flora of Borneo
Flora of the Philippines
Plants described in 1908